Essa Obaid Hassan Hirok or Essa Obaid (born 10 April 1984) in the United Arab Emirates is an Association footballer currently playing as a striker . He has also represented the UAE at international level.

Career
Obaid made an important impact in Al-Shabab's 2012 AFC Champions League campaign when he scored 2 goals in his team's 3-0 over Uzbekistan club Neftchi to qualify for the Group Stage.

International career
Obaid made his debut for the national team during the 2014 FIFA World Cup Qualification match against South Korea.

References

External links
 

1984 births
Living people
Emirati footballers
Al Shabab Al Arabi Club Dubai players
Hatta Club players
United Arab Emirates international footballers
Association football forwards
UAE Pro League players